Dharmagarh is a Vidhan Sabha constituency of Kalahandi district, Odisha.

This constituency includes Dharmgarh block, Kalampur block, Koksara block, and 2 Gram panchayats (Bandigaon and Ranamal) of Jaipatana block.

In 2014 election, Biju Janata Dal candidate Puspendra Singh Deo defeated Bharatiya Janta Party candidate Rabindra Pattjoshi by a margin of 16,158 votes.

In 2009 election, Biju Janata Dal candidate Puspendra Singh Deo defeated Indian National Congress candidate Rahasbihari Behera by a margin of 22,906 votes.

Elected members

Thirteen elections were held between 1957 and 2009. The elected members from the Dharmagarh constituency are:
2019: (79): Mousadhi Bag (BJD)
2014: (79): Puspendra Singh Deo (BJD) 
2009: (79): Puspendra Singh Deo (BJD)
2004: (96): Bira Sipka (BJD) 
2000: (96): Bira Sipka (BJD)
1995: (96): Bira Sipka (Janata Dal)
1990: (96): Bharat Bhusan Bemal (Janata Dal)
1985: (96): Jugaram Behera (Congress)
1980: (96): Gajanan Nayak (Congress-I)
1977: (96): Gajanan Nayak (Congress)
1974: (96): Dayanidhi Naik (Swatantra Party)
1971: (90): Lochan Dhangada Majhi (Swatantra Party)
1967: (90): Lochan Dhangada Majhi (Swatantra Party)
1961: (38): Mukund Naik (Ganatantra Parishad)
1957: (28): Janardan Majhi (Ganatantra Parishad)

2019 Election Result

2014 election Result

Summary of results of the 2009 election

Notes

References

Assembly constituencies of Odisha
Kalahandi district